Territorial defence battalions were volunteer military units of the Armed Forces of Ukraine under the auspices of the Ukrainian Ministry of Defence in 2014–2015. They should not be confused with the volunteer units of Special Tasks Patrol Police of Ukraine created along with territorial defense battalions, but under the auspices of the Ministry of Interior. Together, they are both collectively known as the Ukrainian volunteer battalions. The battalions were established in mid-2014, during the early stages of the war in Donbas, to combat the pro-Russian separatists and the forces of the Donetsk People's Republic, Luhansk People's Republic, and the United Armed Forces of Novorossiya. 32 volunteer territorial defence battalions were formed.

In autumn 2014 most of the territorial defence battalions were reorganized as motorized infantry battalions of the Ukrainian Armed Forces. In 2022 the Territorial Defense Forces were created as a successor of the old territorial defense battalions.

History
In March 2014 acting President of Ukraine Oleksandr Turchynov issued an order to create seven territorial defence battalions. These formations were subordinated to the Ministry of Defense. Battalions generally took their name from wherever most of their recruits were from.

 17 March 2014 Ukraine began first stage of mobilization
 18 March 2014 – 3rd Territorial Defence Battalion was created in Lviv Oblast
 19 March 2014 – the Defence Regiment was created in Dnipropetrovsk (later, the regiment was reformed into two territorial defence battalions)
 6th Territorial Defence Battalion was created in Ternopil Oblast
 9th Territorial Defence Battalion was created in Vinnytsia Oblast
 12 April 2014 – 10th Territorial Defence Battalion was created in Zhytomyr Oblast
 23 April 2014 – The 13th Territorial Defence Battalion was created in Chernihiv Oblast
 24 April 2014 – The 15th Territorial Defence Battalion was created in Sumy Oblast
 The 17th Territorial Defence Battalion was created in Kirovohrad Oblast
 26 April 2014 – The 22nd Territorial Defence Battalion "Kharkiv" was created in Kharkiv Oblast
30 April 2014 Oleksandr Turchynov issued an order to create 27 territorial defence battalions

Since 30 April 2014, all territorial defence battalions have been part of the Armed Forces of Ukraine and fall under the General Staff of the Ukrainian Armed Forces and the governors of the oblasts (provinces) in which they were created. By law, every oblast in Ukraine should create its own territorial defence battalions.

6 May 2014 Ukraine began a second stage of mobilization.
 The 19th Territorial Defence Battalion was created in Mykolaiv and first used in the Mykolaiv area to set up roadblocks to slow separatist entry into the region. However, by July it had been deployed to Donbas to take a more active role in the ongoing war in Donbas, aiding other volunteer battalions and the Armed Forces of Ukraine.
 The 21st Territorial Defence Battalion was created in Kherson Oblast
 24th Territorial Defence Battalion "Aidar" was created in Luhansk Oblast
 The 25th Territorial Defence Battalion "Kyivska Rus" was created in Kyiv Oblast
 34th Territorial Defence Battalion "Batkivshchyna" was created in Kirovohrad Oblast. The battalion was named after (and funded by) the political party with the same name as part of its "Resistance movement".
22 July 2014 Ukraine began third stage of mobilisation
 The 37th Territorial Defence Battalion was formed between 29 August 2014 and 8 September 2014 in Zaporizhia Oblast. According to Zaporizhia Oblast Governor Valeriy Baranov the battalion will be the first of its kind to receive tanks.
 The 40th Territorial Defence Battalion "Kryvbas" was formed in Dnipropetrovsk Oblast
 The 41st Territorial Defence Battalion was formed in Chernihiv Oblast
 The 42nd Territorial Defence Battalion was formed in Kirovohrad Oblast

During the opening stages of the war in eastern Ukraine, the Ukrainian military and police forces were largely ineffective in separatist areas, often surrendering equipment or overwhelmed in cities by large crowds of civilians. Federalist and pro-Russian insurgents quickly gained large swaths of territory. Ukraine also lost control of the Ukrainian–Russian border and this allowed a large inflow of insurgents and military supplies from Russia.

By August 2014 over 5,600 volunteers had joined defence battalions across Ukraine and about 7,000 volunteers had joined by the end of September.

The Russian Communist Party pushed to label the battalions as terrorist organizations, even though they are directly subordinate to the Government of Ukraine and are legal government agencies of Ukraine. Russian politicians have not pushed for declaring pro-Russian insurgents fighting in Ukraine as terrorists.

In the 2014 Ukrainian parliamentary election several members of the battalions were elected into the Ukrainian parliament.

Reorganization
On 10 November 2014 Stepan Poltorak, the Minister of Defence of Ukraine, ordered territorial defence battalions to reorganize as motorized infantry battalions.

2022 Russian full-scale invasion

Before the invasion, the Ukrainian military had already begun an expansion process of the territorial defense forces in preparation of the Russian invasion. After the 2022 Russian invasion of Ukraine, the Ukrainian government announced general mobilisation  and formed new territorial defense battalions to accommodate the influx in men. Theoretically, the TDF could field up to 150 battalions. In social media statements by the TDF, several previously unseen battalion numbers (some exceeding the theoretical 150 number), such as the 103rd, 124th, 130th, 251st  etc. were mentioned, indicating that the TDF has likely expanded far past the initially planned size.

Equipment
The battalions receive basic resources and weapons from the Interior Ministry or the Ministry of Defence. These resources soon proved to be inadequate and numerous groups have helped to equip the battalions. The best known volunteer groups are Self-defence of Maidan, which has its own warehouses in Melitopol, Dnipropetrovsk and Kharkiv, and Army SOS, an initiative of former Euromaidan activists. Volunteers provide things like: hygiene items, food, sleeping bags, night vision goggles and multicopters (for use as drones).

List of territorial defence battalions
 1st Territorial Defence Battalion «Volyn» (Volyn Oblast) disbanded (reorganized into the 1st Independent Motorized Infantry Battalion of the 14th Mechanized Brigade)
 2nd Territorial Defence Battalion "Horyn" (Rivne Oblast) (reorganized into the 2nd Independent Motorized Infantry Battalion of the 30th Mechanized Brigade)

 3rd Territorial Defence Battalion "Volya" (Lviv Oblast)
 4th Territorial Defence Battalion disbanded "Zakarpattia" (Zakarpattia Oblast)
 5th Territorial Defence Battalion "Prykarpattya" (Ivano-Frankivsk Oblast, disbanded in January 2015)
 6th Territorial Defence Battalion "Zbruch" (Ternopil Oblast)
 7th Territorial Defence Battalion (Khmelnytskyi Oblast)
 8th Territorial Defence Battalion (Chernivtsi Oblast)
 9th Territorial Defence Battalion "Vinnytsia" (Vinnytsia Oblast)
 10th Territorial Defence Battalion "Polesia" (Zhytomyr Oblast)
 11th Territorial Defence Battalion "Kyivan Rus" (Kyiv Oblast)
 12th Territorial Defence Battalion "Kyiv" (Kyiv city) disbanded
 13th Territorial Defence Battalion "Chernihiv-1" (Chernihiv Oblast)
 14th Territorial Defence Battalion "Cherkasy" (Cherkasy Oblast)
 15th Territorial Defence Battalion "Sumy" (Sumy Oblast)
 16th Territorial Defence Battalion "Poltava" (Poltava Oblast)
 17th Territorial Defence Battalion "Kirovohrad" (Kirovohrad Oblast)
 18th Territorial Defence Battalion "Odesa" (Odessa Oblast)
 19th Territorial Defence Battalion (Mykolaiv Oblast)
 20th Territorial Defence Battalion "Dnipro" (Dnipropetrovsk Oblast)
 21st Territorial Defence Battalion "Sarmat" (Kherson Oblast)
 22nd Territorial Defence Battalion "Kharkiv" (Kharkiv Oblast)
 23rd Territorial Defence Battalion "Khortytsia" (Zaporizhia Oblast)
 24th Territorial Defence Battalion "Aidar" (Luhansk Oblast)
 25th Territorial Defence Battalion "Kyivan Rus" (Kyiv Oblast)
 34th Territorial Defence Battalion "Batkivshchyna" (Kirovohrad Oblast)
 37th Territorial Defence Battalion (Zaporizhia Oblast)
 39th Territorial Defence Battalion "Dnipro-2" (Dnipropetrovsk Oblast)
 40th Territorial Defence Battalion "Kryvbas" (Dnipropetrovsk Oblast)
 41st Territorial Defence Battalion disbanded "Chernihiv-2" (Chernihiv Oblast)
 42nd Territorial Defence Battalion "Rukh Oporu" (Kirovohrad Oblast)
 43rd Territorial Defence Battalion "Patriot" (Dnipropetrovsk Oblast)

References

 
2014 pro-Russian unrest in Ukraine
War in Donbas
Volunteer military formations of Ukraine
Battalions of Ukraine
Ministry of Defence (Ukraine)